Lise Tremblay (born 13 June 1957) is a French Canadian novelist.

Tremblay was born in Chicoutimi, Quebec. Her first awards were presented at the Saguenay-Lac. St Jean book festival for her 1990 debut novel L'hiver de pluie. Her 1999 novel, La danse juive won that year's Governor General's Award for fiction.

In recent years, she has been teaching literature in Montreal at Cégep du Vieux Montréal.

Awards and recognition
 1999: fiction winner, Governor General's Award, La danse juive
 2003: Grand prix du livre de Montréal , La héronnière
 2004: Prix des libraires du Québec , La héronnière
 2004: Prix Jean-Hamelin , La héronnière

Bibliography
L'hiver de pluie. Montreal: XYZ, 1990. 
La pêche blanche. Montreal: Leméac, 1994. 
La danse juive. Montreal: Leméac, 1999.   (Mile End, trans. Gail Scott, Vancouver: Talonbooks, 2002. )
La héronnière Montreal: Leméac, 2003.  (The Hunting Ground, trans. Linda Gaboriau, Vancouver: Talonbooks, 2006. )
La soeur de Judith. Montreal: Boréal, 2007. 
 L'Habitude des bêtes, Montréal, Éditions du Boréal, 2017,

Further reading
 Robert Dion: L’émergence des formes de la «vie de banlieue» en région dans "La Sœur de Judith" de Lise Tremblay, in "Zeitschrift für Kanada-Studien" ZKS, 68, Wißner, Augsburg 2018,  pp 90 – 103 en ligne

References

External links
  UNEQ/l'ILE: Lise Tremblay, accessed 22 July 2006
 Library and Archives Canada: 1999 Governor General's Award, accessed 22 July 2006

1957 births
Canadian women novelists
French Quebecers
Governor General's Award-winning fiction writers
Living people
Writers from Saguenay, Quebec
Canadian novelists in French